Cars.com is an automotive classified website focused on the United States that launched in June 1998 and now is the second largest automotive classified site. Its headquarters are located in Chicago, Illinois.

History

A 2003 Library Journal survey of automobile-related websites described cars.com as ranked the site positively, noting staff-written reviews that are signed, dated, detailed, and illustrated.  In 2004 the website announced a partnership with Kelley Blue Book and commenced national advertising. In October 2007, it announced plans for its largest marketing campaign ever in early 2008. In the same month, Yahoo! announced plans to receive listings from Cars.com for their Yahoo! Autos service.

Cars.com was previously owned by Classified Ventures, LLC, a joint venture between Gannett, The McClatchy Company, Tribune, Graham Holdings, and A.H. Belo. On August 5, 2014, Gannett announced that it would buy out the remaining stakes in Classified Ventures it did not already own, for $2.5 billion.

In July 2016, Cars.com acquired dealer and service shop rating site DealerRater.

Cars.com was included in the spin-off of Gannett's broadcasting properties as Tegna, Inc. On May 4, 2017, Tegna shareholders approved a plan to spin off Cars.com as a new, publicly traded company; they received a share of the new company, which began trading on the NYSE beginning on June 1, 2017, for every 3 Tegna shares they owned.

In February 2018, Cars.com announced the acquisition of Dealer Inspire, a digital marketing agency serving automotive dealerships located in Naperville, Illinois.

Marketing
Cars.com has regularly advertised during the Super Bowl, screening adverts in consecutive years.

Television

Since July 1998, Cars.com has been in partnership with the Magliozzis of Car Talk and the website includes a Cartalk advice section.

Cars.com also partners with MotorWeek on PBS to provide online access to MotorWeek reviews.

References

Online automotive companies of the United States
Online marketplaces of the United States
Internet properties established in 1998
Retail companies established in 1998
Automotive websites
2014 mergers and acquisitions
Corporate spin-offs
Former Gannett subsidiaries
Companies based in Chicago
2017 initial public offerings
Companies listed on the New York Stock Exchange